Andal Priyadarshini is a Tamil language poet and lyricist, short story writer, and novelist. Currently she is working as a head program officer of Coimbatore
Podhigai TV channel.

She was awarded the titles Kavi Chemmal and Ezhuthulaga Sirpi.

She studied in Chennai Sri Sarada Vidhyalaya school, from which she received best former student award.

Books
Suruthi Pisakatha Veenai
Mudhal Oliparappu Aarambam
Vidivai Thedi 
Pudhiya Thiruppavai

Filmography

As lyricist 
"Ishtam Pole" and "Badham Pazham Pondra" from Ayudha Porattam (2011)
"Idhuthane Engal Veedu" from Nellai Santhippu (2012)

References

External links
Andal Priyadarshini at blogspot.in

Living people
Tamil poets
Indian lyricists
Indian women short story writers
Indian women novelists
1962 births
Writers from Tamil Nadu
People from Tirunelveli district
20th-century Indian short story writers
Women writers from Tamil Nadu
20th-century Indian women writers